NDFI may refer to:

National Development Fund of Iran
Notre Dame Fighting Irish